Dunbar Medal may refer to: 
 a medal issued after the Battle of Dunbar (1650)
 a medal awarded since 1973 by the European Water Association and named in honour of William P. Dunbar